Los Postes is a Lima Metro station on Line 1. The station is located between Los Jardines and San Carlos. It was opened on 3 January 2012 as part of the extension of the line from Miguel Grau to Bayóvar.

References

Lima Metro stations
2012 establishments in Peru
Railway stations opened in 2012